Van Sickle Bi-State Park is a public recreation area straddling the border of California and Nevada, United States, that overlooks Lake Tahoe and preserves the memory of Henry Van Sickle, a key member in the founding of Genoa and the surrounding area. The state park features trails for hiking, mountain biking, and horseback riding. It is managed by the Nevada Division of State Parks in partnership with the California Tahoe Conservancy.

History
Henry Van Sickle came to the Carson Valley in 1852 where he erected a hotel, restaurant, blacksmiths shop, bar, while also being the first toll officer of the Kinsgsbury grade toll road. The property was purchased by Jack where he cut and sold thousands of Christmas trees, had a rodeo, and drive-in movie theater. From the 1960s until 1993, an equestrian stable for tourists, Stateline Stables, operated on the site with up to 60 horses taking riders on trails throughout the area. The ranch belonged to Jack Van Sickle when, in 1988,  of the land was donated to the Nevada Division of State Parks. In 2001, the California Tahoe Conservancy purchased the adjacent California property. The park opened to the public in 2011.

While the California Department of Parks and Recreation was originally involved, the organization dropped out due to continued funding woes. Although part of the park is in California, it is not considered a California state park.

Park
The main entrance as well as most of the historical buildings are on the California side. The Heavenly Ski Resort gondola runs over the park grounds near the barn and stables. Features of the park include the historic Van Sickle farm barn, a 1917-era log cabin, and hiking trails with access to the Tahoe Rim Trail.

References

External links
Van Sickle Bi-State Park Nevada State Parks
Van Sickle Bi-State Park Trails Map Nevada State Parks
Van Sickle Bi-State Park California Tahoe Conservancy

Lake Tahoe
State parks of Nevada
Parks in El Dorado County, California
Protected areas of Douglas County, Nevada
Protected areas established in 2011
2011 establishments in Nevada